George Arthur Palmer (5 June 1897 – 1 June 1962) was an English cricketer active in first-class cricket in 1928, making nine appearances as a right-arm fast-medium bowler for Warwickshire.

Palmer made his debut in first-class cricket when he was selected to play for Warwickshire in the County Championship against Glamorgan at Edgbaston. He made eight more appearances in that season, playing his final match for Warwickshire against Leicestershire. He bowled with little success in his nine first-class matches, taking 8 wickets at an expensive average of 56.25, with best figures of 2/21. As a batsman, he scored 87 runs in ten innings, with a high score of 20.

He died at Higham on the Hill in Leicestershire on 1 June 1962.

References

External links
George Palmer at ESPNcricinfo
George Palmer at CricketArchive

1897 births
1962 deaths
People from the Borough of Rugby
English cricketers
Warwickshire cricketers
People from Lindley, Leicestershire
Cricketers from Leicestershire